La Montagne is a settlement within the commune of Saint-Denis, located along the north coast of the island of Réunion.  Cape Bernard is located near the settlement.

References 

Populated places in Réunion
Saint-Denis, Réunion